John Norman Hyde (born 13 October 1957 in Hamilton, Victoria) was the member in the Western Australian Legislative Assembly for the Electoral district of Perth.

His father was Geelong and Claremont football player John Hyde.

Political career
Hyde was elected to the seat in 2001 after the retirement of Diana Warnock. He was shadow minister for Local Government, Culture and the Arts, Heritage, and Citizenship and Multicultural Interests. He lost his seat in the March 2013 election.

Hyde was the first openly gay man to be elected to the Western Australian parliament. He had previously been mayor of the Town of Vincent.

References

1957 births
Living people
Politicians from Perth, Western Australia
Gay politicians
Members of the Western Australian Legislative Assembly
LGBT legislators in Australia
Deakin University alumni
Murdoch University alumni
Australian schoolteachers
Australian Labor Party members of the Parliament of Western Australia
Mayors of places in Western Australia
People from Hamilton, Victoria
21st-century Australian politicians